Gustav Buser was a footballer who played for FC Basel. He played in the position as forward.

Football career
Between the years 1917 and 1920 Buser played a total of 18 games for Basel scoring a total of six goals. 12 of these games were in the Swiss Serie A and the other six were friendly games. He scored two goals in the domestic league, the other four were scored during the test games.

References

Sources
 Rotblau: Jahrbuch Saison 2017/2018. Publisher: FC Basel Marketing AG. 
 Die ersten 125 Jahre. Publisher: Josef Zindel im Friedrich Reinhardt Verlag, Basel. 
 Verein "Basler Fussballarchiv" Homepage

FC Basel players
Association football forwards
Year of birth missing
Year of death missing
Swiss men's footballers